Valeri Vladimirovich Popenchenko (26 August 1937 – 15 February 1975) was a Soviet Olympic boxer who competed in the middleweight division (−75 kg). During his career he won 200 out of 213 bouts; he won an Olympic gold medal in 1964 and European titles in 1963 and 1965. He was named the Outstanding Boxer of the 1964 Olympics and given the Val Barker Trophy, becoming the only Soviet boxer to receive the honour.

Biography
Popenchenko took boxing in 1948, and in 1959 won his first Soviet title. He finished third in 1960, but reclaimed the title in 1961 through 1965. He retired in 1965 and was awarded the Order of the Red Banner of Labour. In 1968, he graduated from the Leningrad Military Higher School of the Border Service, and from 1970 until his death worked as a head of physical culture department of the Bauman Moscow State Technical University. In the mid 1970s the university was building new sporting facilities, and as department head Popenchenko would often visit the construction site. On 15 February 1975, while running down the stairs where handrails were not yet installed, he lost his balance, fell three floors and died. He was buried at Vvedenskoye Cemetery.

1964 Olympic results
Below are the results from the 1964 Tokyo Olympic boxing tournament of Valeri Popenchenko of the Soviet Union who competed in the middleweight division:

 Round of 32: bye
 Round of 16: defeated Sutan Mahmud (Pakistan) referee stopped contest
 Quarterfinal: defeated Joe Darkey (Ghana) by decision, 5-0
 Semifinal: defeated Tadeusz Walasek (Poland) by knockout
 Final: defeated Emil Schulz (United Team of Germany) referee stopped contest (gold medal)

References

External links

 databaseOlympics
 Profile in the Olympic Encyclopedia
 Biography

1937 births
1975 deaths
Soviet male boxers
Olympic boxers of the Soviet Union
Olympic gold medalists for the Soviet Union
Honoured Masters of Sport of the USSR
Boxers at the 1964 Summer Olympics
Dynamo sports society athletes
Olympic medalists in boxing
Russian male boxers
Medalists at the 1964 Summer Olympics
Middleweight boxers
Burials at Vvedenskoye Cemetery
Sportspeople from Moscow Oblast